Alakayevo (Alaqay) is a rural locality (a village) in Skvorchikhinsky Selsoviet, Ishimbaysky District, Bashkortostan, Russia. The population was 119 as of 2010. There are 3 streets.

Geography 
Alakayevo is located 16 km south of Ishimbay (the district's administrative centre) by road. Yuldashevo is the nearest rural locality.

References 

Rural localities in Ishimbaysky District
Ufa Governorate